Jo Allen is an English animation producer. She is known for producing The Pearce Sisters (2007) and voicing Lil' Sis in Angry Kid (1999).

Awards and nominations

She won a BAFTA Award for Best Short Animation for The Pearce Sisters (2007).

Filmography

As a producer

References

External links

 

English film producers
British film producers
British animated film producers
BAFTA winners (people)
English voice actresses
Living people
Year of birth missing (living people)
Place of birth missing (living people)